Perišče is a small settlement south of Velika Dolina in the Municipality of Brežice in eastern Slovenia, close to the border with Croatia. The area is part of the traditional region of Lower Carniola. It is now included with the rest of the municipality in the Lower Sava Statistical Region.

References

External links
Perišče on Geopedia

Populated places in the Municipality of Brežice